Jonathan Caparelli (born 21 June 1995) is an Argentine footballer.

Career

College
Caparelli briefly played at Golden West College in 2014, featuring in a single game.

Professional
Caparelli signed with United Soccer League side Real Monarchs on 21 October 2015. He was sent on loan to Premier Development League side Kitsap Pumas shortly after signing.

References

External links 
 

1995 births
Living people
Real Monarchs players
Kitsap Pumas players
FC Golden State Force players
Chattanooga Red Wolves SC players
FC Tucson players
USL League Two players
Argentine footballers
Argentine expatriate footballers
Expatriate soccer players in the United States
Association football defenders
Soccer players from California
USL League One players
UCLA Bruins men's soccer players
Expatriate footballers in Germany
Los Angeles Force players
Golden West Rustlers men's soccer players
Footballers from Buenos Aires